M1895, or Model of 1895, can refer to:

Nagant M1895 - a revolver
Steyr-Mannlicher M1895 - an Austrian bolt-action rifle
M1895 Lee Navy - an American bolt-action rifle
Winchester Model 1895 - a lever-action rifle
M1895 Colt–Browning machine gun - a machine gun
10-inch gun M1895 - a U.S. Army coast artillery piece
12-inch gun M1895 - a U.S. Army coast artillery piece
16-inch gun M1895 - a U.S. Army coast artillery piece